Mimachlamys crassicostata is a species of bivalve belonging to the family Pectinidae.

The species is found in Southeastern Asia.

References

Pectinidae